Sarkandaugava is a neighbourhood of Riga, Latvia.

Origins of the name 

The name of the neighbourhood derives from that of the Sarkandaugava ('Red Daugava'), a minor arm of the Daugava that formerly separated Pētersala from the mainland. As Riga developed and expanded, more and more of the Sarkandaugava was filled in, but it still appeared on maps from the late 1930s. All that remains of the Sarkandaugava today is a small, unnamed bay next to the bridge from the Tvaika street area over to Kundziņsala.

External links 
History of Sarkandaugava 
The home page about Sarkandaugava - www.citariga.lv
Kadinsky, Sergey "Sarkandaugava, Riga" Hidden Waters Blog November 14, 2016

Neighbourhoods in Riga